Caleb Russell Clay (born February 15, 1988) is an American former professional baseball pitcher. He played in the KBO League for the Hanwha Eagles.

Career
Clay was drafted by the Boston Red Sox in the first round of the 2006 Major League Baseball Draft out of Cullman High School in Cullman, Alabama. He signed a minor league deal with the Washington Nationals before the 2013 season. He reached Triple-A for the first time in his career that year.

Clay signed with the Hanwha Eagles of Korea Professional Baseball in December 2013. On June 21, 2014 he signed a minor league deal with the Los Angeles Angels of Anaheim. His contract was selected from the Triple-A Salt Lake Bees on August 10, and he was outrighted back to Salt Lake three days later without appearing in a game.

References

External links

Career statistics and player information from Korea Baseball Organization

1988 births
Living people
Baseball players from Birmingham, Alabama
People from Cullman, Alabama
Hanwha Eagles players
Lowell Spinners players
Gulf Coast Red Sox players
Greenville Drive players
Salem Red Sox players
Portland Sea Dogs players
Harrisburg Senators players
Syracuse Chiefs players
Salt Lake Bees players
American expatriate baseball players in South Korea
KBO League pitchers
Scottsdale Scorpions players
Reno Aces players